Marquis Preferred is a 1929 silent film comedy directed by Frank Tuttle and starring Adolphe Menjou. It was produced and distributed by Paramount Pictures.

Cast
Adolphe Menjou - Marquis d'Argenville
 Nora Lane - Peggy Winton
 Chester Conklin - Mr. Gruger
 Dot Farley - Mrs. Gruger (*billed Dorothy Farley)
 Lucille Powers - Gwendolyn Gruger
 Mischa Auer - Albert
 Alex Melesh - Floret
 Michael Visaroff - Jacques

References

External links
 Marquis Preferred @ IMDb.com

lobby poster

1929 films
American silent feature films
Films directed by Frank Tuttle
1929 comedy films
American black-and-white films
Silent American comedy films
1920s English-language films
1920s American films